Wayne Stevens may refer to:

Wayne Stevens (basketball) (born 1936), American basketballer
Wayne Stevens (software engineer) (1944–1993), American software engineer
Bones Hillman (Wayne Stevens, 1958–2020), New Zealand musician
Wayne Stevens (rugby union) (born 1988), South African rugby player